Alexander Andreyevich Polunin (born 25 May 1997) is a Russian professional ice hockey forward who currently plays for Lokomotiv Yaroslavl of the Kontinental Hockey League (KHL).

Playing career
He made his professional debut with Lokomotiv Yaroslavl in the 2015–16 season.

On 21 July 2020, Polunin was traded by Lokomotiv to Amur Khabarovsk in exchange for the rights to North American Ryan Strome. After recording career highs of 11 goals and 26 points through 60 games of the 2020–21 season with Amur Khabarovsk, Polunin was returned to Lokomotiv on 1 June 2021.

References

External links
 

1997 births
Living people
Amur Khabarovsk players
Lokomotiv Yaroslavl players
Russian ice hockey left wingers
HC Ryazan players
HC Sochi players
Ice hockey people from Moscow